Klajdi Broshka (born 18 November 1993 in Elbasan) is an Albanian professional football player who currently plays for KS Lushnja in the Albanian First Division.

Career
Broshka joined KS Lushnja ahead of the 2019-20 season.

References

https://www.fupa.net/spieler/klajdi-broshka-1680383.html#fupa_app_share_start

1993 births
Living people
Footballers from Elbasan
Albanian footballers
Association football defenders
KF Elbasani players
KS Turbina Cërrik players
KF Apolonia Fier players
KS Egnatia Rrogozhinë players
Kategoria Superiore players